Matthew Justin Crafton (born June 11, 1976) is an American professional stock car racing driver. He is a three-time champion of the NASCAR Craftsman Truck Series (2013, 2014, 2019), in which he competes full-time, driving the No. 88 Ford F-150 for ThorSport Racing.

Early career
Crafton was born in Tulare, California. Before turning to NASCAR racing in 2000, he raced go-karts, midgets, and mini sprints. Crafton began his go-kart career at the age of seven after receiving a kart as a present for graduating from kindergarten. He won multiple national and regional championships before moving to midgets at the age of 15, winning twenty main events.

He joined the Featherlite Southwest Series as a substitute for his injured father, Danny Crafton, in 1996, filling in as the driver of the No. 46 entry for the final three races of the season. Crafton took over the No. 46 full-time in 1997. His career went national when he became involved in the 1998 Winter Heat Series shown on ESPN at Tucson Raceway Park, during which he raced against other current NASCAR drivers Greg Biffle, Kevin Harvick, Kurt Busch, and Ron Hornaday.

After four full-time seasons in the Featherlite Southwest Series, Crafton won the championship in 2000 on the strength of four wins that year. His success in the Featherlite Southwest Series that season led to the invitation to make his NASCAR Craftsman Truck Series debut for SealMaster Racing.

NASCAR career

Craftsman Truck Series

Crafton made his Truck Series debut in 2000 at the season finale at California Speedway. Driving the PickupTruck.com Chevy for ThorSport Racing, he qualified 17th and finished ninth. In 2001, he piloted the No. 88 for ThorSport full-time with sponsorship from Fast Track Delivery Sealer and XE Sighting System. He had eleven top-tens and finished twelfth in the championship standings, third behind Ricky Hendrick and Travis Kvapil for Rookie of the Year. Menards first joined as an associate sponsor in 2002 and that season he earned six top-tens and finished fifteenth in points. Crafton earned 11 top 10s before finishing 11th in points in 2003.

In 2004, Crafton signed on to drive the No. 6 GM Goodwrench Silverado owned by Kevin Harvick Incorporated. He posted a best finish of third place in two races, and with six top fives and 17 top 10s, he ended the season fifth in the final standings. Despite strong statistics in 2004, he was released from KHI and returned to ThorSport for the 2005 season, where he won his first career pole at New Hampshire International Speedway, earning two top fives and 10 top 10s and finishing ninth in the standings. In 2006, he had four top-five finishes, 10 top-10 finishes, and finished fourteenth in points. In 2007, he improved to eighth in points and posted ten top-ten finishes for the third consecutive season.

Crafton's first NASCAR win came at Charlotte Motor Speedway on May 16, 2008, in the North Carolina Education Lottery 200. It was his 178th start, the record for most starts a driver has had before getting his first win in the Truck Series. The win moved him into the top five in points for 2008. Later that season, Crafton filled in for Robby Gordon in practice and qualified for the NASCAR Sprint Cup Series event at Homestead because Gordon was at the final off-road race of the season.

In 2009, although he did not win a race that season, Crafton scored two poles (Chicagoland Speedway and Texas Motor Speedway), 11 top-five and 21 top-10 finishes, ultimately finishing second in the point standings behind champion Ron Hornaday. Crafton had another strong season in 2010, earning one pole at Texas Motor Speedway, 10 top-five, and 20 top-10 finishes, resulting in a season-ending rank of fourth.

2011 saw the second win of Crafton's career at Iowa Speedway, in addition to poles at Michigan International Speedway and Martinsville Speedway, where he broke the track qualifying record. However, four DNFs (Did Not Finish) due to engine failures, mechanical issues and accidents caused by other competitors led to only five top fives and 13 top 10s, ultimately relegating Crafton to eighth in the final standings. In 2012, after the team had moved from Chevrolet to Toyota, he had a decent season, finishing 6th in points.

2013 was Crafton's best season in his career to date. He won his third career race at Kansas in April. After this win, Crafton picked up the points lead and held it for the rest of the season.  He finished in the top ten in the first sixteen races of the season, and 19 overall, with a worst finish of 21st in the season finale at Homestead. He clinched his first Truck Series championship with his start in that race, and was able to stay on the lead lap despite late crash damage to become the first driver to complete every lap of the season in the Truck Series. He also made his Nationwide debut that year, running the No. 33 car for Richard Childress Racing, since the car was sponsored by Menards (which he drives in the Truck series). He ran both Kentucky races and Chicagoland in July. He performed well in all 3 races, finishing 3rd at both Kentucky races and 10th at Chicagoland.

On March 30, 2014, Crafton scored his fourth career Truck win at Martinsville.  On June 6, he won on fuel strategy at Texas Motor Speedway to win two races in a season for the first time in his career.  It was also the first time he led more than 100 laps in a race.  Despite crashing out at Dover and Gateway, his first DNFs in over two years, Crafton would ultimately go on to become the first back-to-back champion in the Truck Series.

On February 28, 2015, Crafton scored his sixth career Truck victory in the revived Atlanta race.  On May 8, he used fuel strategy to win at Kansas after multiple other top five Trucks ran out in the closing laps, winning a second race at one track for the first time in his career.  He is also the first driver to win two Truck races at Kansas.  On June 5, he won at Texas, successfully defending his win from the year before, another career first.  His fourth win of the season came at Kentucky after the race was cut short due to damage to the catch fence from Ben Kennedy's crash.  Crafton scored his fifth victory of the season at Martinsville on October 31, marking his second win at Martinsville, and the deepest into the season he had ever won a race to that point.  He would add one more win in the season finale at Homestead-Miami, marking his first career victory from the pole; his season total of six wins are more than in his entire career before 2015.  However, Crafton struggled more noticeably with consistency than in the previous two seasons.  He crashed out at Gateway for the second year in a row after tangling with John Hunter Nemechek, and a few weeks later crashed out at Pocono after getting hit by Brad Keselowski.  He would get swept up in a third wreck at Talladega with Stanton Barrett after being penalized for speeding on pit road, and while racing eventual series champion Erik Jones for the win at Phoenix would wreck out one final time, all of which eventually consigned him to third in points behind Jones and Tyler Reddick.

On May 13, 2016, Crafton scored his twelfth career Truck victory at Dover.  Eight days later, he scored his second career victory at Charlotte, marking the first back-to-back victories in his career.

In the 2017 NextEra Energy Resources 250, while leading on the final lap, Crafton was caught in a late-race incident and was clipped by Ben Rhodes; the contact turned his truck, sent it airborne into a flip, before landing on its wheels. On July 19, he scored his fourteenth career victory at Eldora. Despite finishing last of the final 4 drivers at Homestead, Crafton wound up with his 16th top-ten finish of 2017.

For the first time since 2012, Crafton went winless in 2018 with a season's best finish of 2nd at the fifth race of the season at Dover and went on to finish 6th in the final point standings despite being eliminated after the Round of 6.

 Although Crafton still won no races throughout 2019, he made his 2nd-ever Championship 4 appearance. He finished 2nd at Homestead to Austin Hill and 2 spots ahead of Ross Chastain to claim his 3rd career Truck Series Championship.

On July 25, 2020, Crafton broke a 67-race winless streak by winning at Kansas Speedway for the 3rd time in his career. That was his only win of the season. He failed to make the Championship 4. 

In 2021, Crafton went winless again, but made the Championship 4, benefited by late-race chaos at Martinsville. Crafton finished 4th in points.

Crafton did not make the playoffs easily in 2022, as he had to hold off Derek Kraus for the final spot, which he succeeded at doing. Crafton was eliminated in the first round of the playoffs, landing only 9th place in points with 2 top 5’s for the season.

Cup Series
Because of Crafton's sponsorship with Menards, he has made spot duty with Menards' Cup teams, including taking over for Paul Menard on occasion. In March, with Menard on paternity leave, he was on stand-by to relief drive for Paul Menard at Las Vegas Motor Speedway for the Kobalt 400, due to Menard and his wife expecting their first child. Crafton practiced and qualified for Menard at the Auto Club 400, qualifying 30th. At Talladega's 2019 1000Bulbs.com 500, he was on standby for Menard's No. 21 Wood Brothers Racing Ford while Menard was dealing with neck pain; Crafton practiced the car on Friday. Menard eventually ran the first stage before Crafton relieved him for the remainder of the race; he was involved in a multi-car wreck on lap 163 but finished 14th.

In 2014, he attempted to make his Cup Series debut with RAB Racing in the No. 29 at the Brickyard 400, but failed to qualify. Later in the year, he returned to the Childress Cup paddock, qualifying the No. 78 Furniture Row Racing Chevy at the Pure Michigan 400 in place of Martin Truex Jr., who was on leave as his girlfriend, Sherry Pollex, underwent cancer treatment.

Crafton ran his first Cup race in the 2015 Daytona 500, substituting for Kyle Busch in the Joe Gibbs Racing No. 18 after Busch suffered a compound leg fracture in the previous day's Xfinity Series race. He finished 18th after starting 43rd. Over four years later, he made his second Cup start in the 2019 First Data 500 at Martinsville in the No. 36 of Front Row Motorsports after Matt Tifft was hospitalized with a health problem.

Milestones and records
Throughout 22 full-time seasons in the NASCAR Camping World Truck Series, Crafton has reached several milestones and broken records, both individually and with his team:

Crafton holds the record for the most consecutive Truck Series starts by an active driver.
In the third race of the 2013 season, Crafton passed Terry Cook's record of consecutive starts in the series. Cook had held the record with 296 consecutive starts.
Crafton currently holds the record for the fastest qualifying lap at Martinsville Speedway in a truck. Crafton set the record on October 29, 2011, with a qualifying lap of 19.653 seconds (96.352 mph)

On August 6, 2011, Crafton and teammate Johnny Sauter started ThorSport Racing's 354th NCWTS race with at least one entry in the field, eclipsing Roush Fenway Racing's previous record of 353.
On November 14, 2014, Crafton became the first back-to-back NCWTS champion.
On November 15, 2019, Crafton claimed his 3rd career Championship despite going winless for the second season in a row. He became the first in Series history to claim a Championship despite finishing a season winless and the second to pull off the feat in any Series since Austin Dillon in 2013.

Other racing

In 2012, Crafton, supported by Travis Pastrana, competed in the TORC: The Off-Road Championship series' PRO 2WD truck race at Chicagoland, finishing third. He returned to TORC in 2015, running in the Pro 4WD division in a Chris Kyle Memorial Benefit-sponsored truck at Texas. During the race, he was forced to operate the truck with a two-wheel drive due to problems with his truck's differential.

Crafton raced in the 2014 and 2015 IWK 250 pro stock races at Riverside International Speedway in support of the IWK Health Centre in Halifax, Nova Scotia. Crafton sat on the pole for the 2014 edition of the race, and wound up finishing 10th, one lap down. In 2015 Crafton started third and quickly made his way to the front of the pack before retiring from the race with brake failure, ultimately finishing 21st.

In March 2019, Crafton participated in the Michelin Pilot Challenge sports car race at Sebring International Raceway, driving a Ford for Multimatic Motorsports alongside ThorSport Racing teammates Grant Enfinger, Ben Rhodes, and Myatt Snider.

Motorsports career results

NASCAR
(key) (Bold – Pole position awarded by qualifying time. Italics – Pole position earned by points standings or practice time. * – Most laps led.)

Monster Energy Cup Series

Daytona 500

Nationwide Series

Craftsman Truck Series

 Season still in progress
 Ineligible for series points

ARCA Racing Series
(key) (Bold – Pole position awarded by qualifying time. Italics – Pole position earned by points standings or practice time. * – Most laps led.)

References

External links

 
 Official profile at ThorSport Racing
 

1976 births
Living people
People from Tulare, California
Racing drivers from California
NASCAR drivers
ARCA Menards Series drivers
NASCAR Truck Series champions
Sportspeople from Tulare County, California
Richard Childress Racing drivers
Joe Gibbs Racing drivers
Multimatic Motorsports drivers
Michelin Pilot Challenge drivers